Stars Go Dim (SGD) is an American pop rock band from Tulsa, Oklahoma that formed in late 2007. The band originally consisted of Chris Cleveland (vocals, piano, and guitar), Joey Avalos (guitar), Michael Wittig (bass guitar), and Lester Estelle II (drums). Now composed of Chris Cleveland, the band recently signed to Curb Records (Word Entertainment). Stars Go Dim announced their major label released, self-titled debut album in October 2015. Their first single is "You Are Loved".

History
Stars Go Dim began as a side project of the Christian rock band Pillar. Wittig and Estelle ultimately left Pillar to focus on Stars Go Dim in 2008.  Avalos was also a touring member of Pillar before committing to the new band, and was previously in Justifide.

After forming in late 2007, the band finished recording and finally released their first self-titled EP in October 2008, which consists of five tracks: "Come Around", "Crazy", "Walk On", "Incredible", and, "Get Over It". Avalos stated that, "We just love to write songs that make you want to sing-along," and "it wasn't until I had written a twelve or so songs that we realized what we had. It's really this intricate mess of a love story that will unfold itself with our full-length album."

After forming and releasing their first EP, the band has had a moderate string of success. They've opened up for Switchfoot, The Fray, Daughtry, and Graham Colton and have shared the stage with Paramore, The All-American Rejects, and The Roots. The band credits their success to their fans. Cleveland stated, "We really do have the best fans. Really. They were onboard with us when we just had a few videos of us writing the songs and no other music or bells and whistles to offer." Wittig also commented about the band's fans, saying, "The online communities have helped us get to know our fans better and vice versa. We're always coming up with new ways to connect."

To follow up their EP, the band released their first full-length album Love Gone Mad August 4, 2009.

Since 2010 Lester Estelle II is not an official band member, but he still does engineering and studio work for the band.  In 2011 SGD released two singles, "Like I Mean It" and "Hesitate", and shot music videos for both. "Like I Mean It" music video is taken for rotation on mtvU in February 2011.

The band signed to Fervent Records, a Word Records imprint, where they released their first major label studio album, Stars Go Dim, on October 30, 2015.

Discography

Studio albums

Love Gone Mad was released on August 4, 2009. The band also filmed a music video for the songs "Come Around" and "Get Over It". Discussing the album, Avalos once stated, "I probably wrote 20 songs in roughly two weeks and this is what came out of it."

EPs

 2008 – Stars Go Dim
 2011 – Between Here and Now
 2018 – Better
 2018 – Christmas Is Here

Singles

Band members

Current members
 Chris Cleveland lead vocals, piano, guitar (2007–present)

Former members
 Lester Estelle II keyboard, backing vocals (2007–2010) and drums (2012)
 Kevin Rogers acoustic guitar (2007)
 Luke Sullivant acoustic guitar (2007)
 Michael Wittig bass guitar (2012)

Awards and nominations
In 2009, the band won the Channel One News Hear It Now Artist of the Year Award. That same year, the band won the "Absolute Best of Tulsa" award by Urban Tulsa Weekly for the Best Pop Rock Group August 8, 2009.

In 2016, Stars Go Dim were nominated for a Dove Award for 'New Artist of the Year'.

References

External links
 

Musical quartets
Musical groups from Oklahoma
Musical groups established in 2007
American pop rock music groups
2007 establishments in Oklahoma
Word Records artists